The Persistence is a survival horror video game developed and published by Firesprite. Originally released for the virtual reality headset PlayStation VR in July 2018, the game was released for PC, Nintendo Switch, Xbox One in May 2020. An Enhanced version of the game was released for PC, PlayStation 5 and Xbox Series X and Series S in June 2021.

Gameplay
The Persistence is a first-person survival horror game. The game is set onboard The Persistence, a stranded spaceship in the year 2057. The player assumes control of a clone of security officer Zimri Eder. He is tasked to reactivate the ship's stardrive in order to escape while fighting mutated clones which have occupied the ship. Stealth is encouraged, though the player also has access to several weapons, including a taser gun named the Harvester, a gravity gun named the Gravometric Hook, as well as items such as Ivy Serum which temporarily turns an enemy into an ally. The game also features elements commonly found in roguelike games. The player needs to complete tasks on each of the four ship decks, though the ship layout, which is procedurally generated, changes whenever the player uses a teleporter. As the player explores the ship, they will find FAB chips, which can be used to unlock weapon upgrades, and stem cells, which can grant the player passive perks such as increased health or enhanced strength. Whenever the player dies, they will respawn as another clone of Zimri Eder. A companion app for iOS and Android was released alongside the game, which allows up to four players to influence how a game play out by either helping or hindering a player's progress.

Development
The game was developed by UK-based developer Firesprite. The studio was inspired by sci-fi classics including Alien, as well as games such as Dead Space and System Shock. Stories of Your Life and Others, a collection of short stories by American writer Ted Chiang, was also a major source of inspiration. Development of the game first started in early 2015. The studio used their experience developing The Playroom and The Playroom VR to understand how social play and interaction worked when they were developing the companion app. Firesprite chose Unreal Engine 4 as the game's engine because it allowed the team to prototype and experiment with different gameplay mechanics quickly.

Firesprite officially announced the game in March 2017. It was initially released for virtual reality headset PlayStation VR exclusively on July 24, 2018. A modified version of the game, which allows players to play the game without using any VR headset, was released on May 21, 2022 for PC, PS4, Xbox One and Nintendo Switch. The Persistence Enhanced was released for PC, PlayStation 5 and Xbox Series X and Series S on June 4, 2021. Players who owned the game on PS4, Xbox One or PC will be able to upgrade their game at no additional cost.

Reception
According to review aggregator Metacritic, the PC version of the game received generally positive reviews based on 4 reviews, while the PlayStation 5 version received "mixed or average" reviews based on 5 reviews. Ian Higton, reviewing the PSVR version, described the game as "an ideal purchase for VR horror fans", and remarked that the game, with its roguelike elements, "offers way more in terms of gameplay" when compared with other VR titles in the market. Sammy Barker from Push Square, reviewing the PS5 version of the game, also liked the roguelike elements and the game's sense of progression, though noted that some of the systems "feel odd outside of VR".

References

External links
 

PlayStation 4 games
Windows games
PlayStation 5 games
Nintendo Switch games
Xbox One games
Xbox Series X and Series S games
Video games developed in the United Kingdom
Survival horror video games
Roguelike video games
Video games set in the 2050s
Video games set in outer space
Video games about cloning
Video games using procedural generation
Virtual reality games
PlayStation VR games
2018 video games